Quinten L. Burg (born 1948) is a retired American politician. He was a Democratic member of the South Dakota House of Representatives, representing the 22nd district since 2006. He earlier served from 1998 through 2004, and was Assistant Minority Leader from 2000 through 2004.

Democratic Party members of the South Dakota House of Representatives
1948 births
Living people
People from Jerauld County, South Dakota
Farmers from South Dakota
Ranchers from South Dakota